September in the Rain is a 1937 Warner Bros. Merrie Melodies cartoon directed by Friz Freleng. The short was released on December 18, 1937.

Timed at 5 minutes and 50 seconds, September in the Rain is one of the shortest among all Warner Bros. Merrie Melodies or Looney Tunes animated short subjects. Due to the controversy engendered by the sequences considered to depict racial stereotyping, it has been most commonly edited to a much shorter running of four or even three minutes, with the invariable excision of the Fats Waller–Louis Armstrong "Nagasaki" production number and, often, the Al Jolson title song performance. Although not listed among the Censored Eleven, the cartoon has been exhibited infrequently, even in its brief censored version.

Re-released under the "Blue Ribbon" label, September in the Rain was shorn of its original title card containing all the credited names, however, the recovered card, along with those for other "Blue Ribbon" reissues, is available for viewing.

Synopsis

"Am I Blue?", coffee, clog dance and bagpipe music
Seen from the inside of a brightly lit grocery store, the plate glass storefront window shows a dark and rainy night. The song "Am I Blue?" (voice of unbilled Wini Shaw) is heard, revealing the performer to be a bottle of blueing with a face, arms and legs. The bottle's feet are shod in spats-covered footwear and its label states, "for keeping your clothes white and clean".

Next, a white-bearded fakir on a coffee can label that also depicts the words "air-tite dated" and "coffee that is coffee", plays a pungi-like instrument, causing a tube of "Tootsie Tooth Paste" to squeeze out a stream of snake-dancing paste with the tube's cap serving as a hat.

Then, a can marked "Searchlight", with a lighthouse pictured on the label, sends out a light beam, while four identical blonde women wearing blue dresses, aprons and wooden shoes, step off four cans of "Old Maid Cleanser" ("Old Dutch Cleanser") and perform a Klompendansen-styled clog dance which ends with the women showing their clothed backsides, including a flash of white underwear, to the audience.

After that, a shallow box marked "Rubber Gloves" is seen. A single glove rises and walks out of the box using three fingers as feet and two as hands. It has drawn lines indicating eyes and eyebrows as well as a large mouth which inhales air and inflates the glove, emitting the sound of a bagpipe upon exhaling. The glove's drawing in of more air and repetition of the bagpipe sound provides inspiration to the subsequent act — three packs of cigarettes, marked "Carmel / Turkish Blend" (Camel), each with a picture of a small-scale Egyptian pyramid at the feet of a two-humped camel. The camel executes a dancing walk to the bagpipe music which carries over to the next shelf, featuring two bottles of "Good Ol' Scotch", each of which bears a label depicting a kilt-wearing thistle, the floral emblem of Scotland. The plants, with two leafy arms and two leafy legs, step off their labels of Scotch and perform the traditional Scottish dance "Highland Fling", each touching a leafy finger to the top of its budding head.

Chicks and worm
The scene moves to a display of apples where, to the tune of "In the Shade of the Old Apple Tree", a worm pops out and is chased by five chicks which jump off the box fronts (only three boxes are visible) of "My Ami? Powder" (Bon Ami). One of the chicks swallows the worm and begins to involuntarily bounce around and forcibly move in a violent worm-like crawl. The worm eventually pops out of the chick's beak and jumps back into the apple's wormhole.

"By a Waterfall" and Al Jolson's "September in the Rain"
A shelf featuring boxes of "Threaded Wheat" (Shredded Wheat) has, on its front, a factory-styled structure in the background and a river waterfall in the foreground (a stylized representation of Shredded Wheat's longtime factory in the New York State city of Niagara Falls). The melody of "By a Waterfall" is heard (sung by unbilled Wini Shaw), as the water cascades to the shelf below and rains over round (unnamed) cardboard containers depicting an umbrella-holding girl resembling the familiar image from "Morton Salt". Nearby, a raincoat-wearing boy on a package of "Uneedum Crackers" (Uneeda Biscuit), hears her singing, steps off, walks to her label and joins her in a Dick Powell–Ruby Keeler-styled duet from Warners' 1933 musical Footlight Parade, while still holding his oversized box of crackers.

A glance at another shelf reveals a box of "Generates Food / Dream of Wheat / Easy to Jest" (Cream of Wheat) featuring, on the front, a large caricature of Al Jolson, in blackface, wearing a chef's uniform with an oversized red bowtie. He begins to sing "September in the Rain", a song introduced by James Melton in that year's Warners' musical, Melody for Two. As the point of view rotates to the nearby package of "Aunt Emma Pancake Flour" (Aunt Jemima) and then returns to Jolson stepping off the front of the box, the lettering "Generates Food" now appears as "Regenerate Food".

Turning to "Aunt Emma", Jolson exclaims, "and look who's comin' to see me — 'tis mammy — ohhhh… nobody else's". Aunt Emma extends arms to him from her package and responds, with a big smile, "Sonny Boy", a song Jolson introduced in the 1928 Warners' part-talkie The Singing Fool. Jolson continues to sing and points to his "li'l ol' Southern home" — a container of "Cabin Syrup" (Log Cabin syrup) with windshield wipers flinging away the September rain from the cabin windows — and then to "Brite Sun Cleanser" shining over the "Cabin Syrup". He ends with the sign-off phrase, "Good evening, friends..."

Fred Astaire and Ginger Rogers dance
A different shelf shows a pack of "Domingo Cigarettes", with a stylized depiction of Ginger Rogers in a checkered party hat, alongside a pack of "Tareytown Cigarettes / Cork Tips / There's a Funny Thing About Them" (Tareyton), which depicts a stylized Fred Astaire. The miniature stars step off the fronts of the packs, as spats-wearing Astaire flings away his top hat along with cane and, sporting ballroom dancing outfits, they launch into a realistically intricate rotoscoped performance in which, as a representation of their stairstep routine, they repeatedly dance up and down matchboxes, past oversize packs of "Park Avenue" and "Lucky Blows / They're Roasted" (Lucky Strike) cigarettes. At the end of their act, they segue into a brief tap dance and then walk off behind the multitude of cigarette packs.

Fats Waller, Louis Armstrong and "Nagasaki"
Watching Astaire and Rogers finish their dance, two nearly-naked figures, wearing only brief tutus on the box front of "Gold Rust Twins Washing Powder" (Gold Dust Twins), one of whom is a caricature of Fats Waller wearing a tiny bowler hat, shout, "swing it, brother", to a "Bisquit" (Bisquick) chef banging upon an oversized drum. A hammer-wielding arm on the package of "Strong Arm Baking Soda / Burp and Company Carbonated Soda" (Arm & Hammer) strikes the side of "Kleenax for Pots and Pans" as Fats Waller jumps over to the box of "Piano Wax" and, with a stogie in his mouth, begins to play and sing. The other "Gold Rust Twin", a caricature of Louis Armstrong, remains at the front of the box and joins in the singing of "Nagasaki". Two roosters on the front of "Chicken Feed" follow the rhythm, Aunt Emma steps off the box of her Aunt Emma Pancake Flour, executing dance steps and waving her arms, while triplicate packages feature "Yea Man" chefs singing in unison. Fats Waller leans back in his piano chair and continues to play with great speed, now using his toes, while Louis Armstrong energetically picks up the "Nagasaki" melody on his jazz trumpet, with close-ups of his fingers pressing the valves.

As the music reaches its climax, the viewpoint moves back to the big storefront window and irises out on the rainy night sky.

Reception
The Film Daily (December 12, 1937): "In this cartoon done in Technicolor, the scene is a grocery store after closing time, with the rain pouring down. The fantasy has all the trade-marked characters on the labels of boxes and cans come to life and join in a party staged to swing music. The musical revue is cleverly handled, with a lot of well known advertised goods thinly disguised getting a nice plug, intentional or otherwise. Who knows? Who cares? It is smartly done."

Motion Picture Exhibitor (January 1, 1938): "No plot this time, just some take-offs on nationally advertized goods with slight variation. Animation is nice; a burlesque on Jolson is clever; gags are up to the usual high standard, but short lacks the sock quality of some of the series."

Boxoffice (February 5, 1938): "A cheerful and pleasing fantasy which takes place in a grocery store. The familiar trademarks and symbols on the various products come to life and participate in a musical revue set to swing music. The cartoon is conceived in a gay and light manner."

See also
Censored Eleven

Sources

References

External links

September in the Rain at British Film Institute

1937 comedy films
1937 films
1937 animated films
Short films directed by Friz Freleng
Merrie Melodies short films
1930s Warner Bros. animated short films
Films about worms